Real Playing Game (also known as RPG) is a 2013 Portuguese science fiction film directed by Tino Navarro and David Rebordão, produced and co-written by Navarro. The film stars Rutger Hauer, Soraia Chaves, and Pedro Granger.

Plot
The wealthy Steve Battier (Rutger Hauer) is desperate to find a way to stay alive, as he is both elderly and terminally ill. When a company known as RPG offers him the chance to become young again in return for a large amount of money, he jumps at the chance to participate. Ten millionaires from throughout the world will be placed inside younger bodies for ten hours, but with the catch that every hour someone will die. Exhilarated from the rush of possessing a younger body, Steve is prepared to do whatever it takes to keep that body- despite the fact that experience and reality is not always the same thing.

Cast
 Rutger Hauer as Steve Battier
Cian Barry as Young Steve Battier
 Alix Wilton Regan as Young Player #1
 Dafne Fernández as Young Player #5
 Soraia Chaves as Sarah
 Cloudia Swann as Young Player #8
 Nik Xhelilaj as Young Player #2
 Victória Guerra as RPG Chauffeur
 Pedro Granger as Young Player #3
 Chris Tashima as GameKeeper
 Débora Monteiro as Young Player #9
 Christopher Goh as Young Player #4
 Tino Navarro as Financial Speculator
 Genevieve Capovilla as Young Player #6
 Reuben-Henry Biggs as Young Player #7

References

External links
 

2013 films
2013 science fiction films
Portuguese science fiction films
English-language Portuguese films
2010s English-language films